Kuldeep Vats (born 5 May 1975) is an Indian National Congress politician representing the Badli Vidhan Sabha constituency in Haryana, India.

References 

1975 births
Living people
Haryana MLAs 2014–2019
Haryana MLAs 2019–2024
Indian National Congress politicians from Haryana